Aeolosoma is a genus of minute annelid worms, variously attributed either to oligochaetes or polychaetes. Unlike most polychaetes, they reside in freshwater environments in various parts of the world. 

Aeolosoma are transparent worms, very thin and of the length of 1.5–2 mm.  They usually reproduce asexually. This is done by paratomy (fragmentation), when the posterior segments are separated from the parent worm. It starts when the worm reaches a certain number of millimeters (depending on the species). Only one species, Aeolosoma singulare, is known to reproduce sexually.

Aeolosoma feed on microalgae, microorganisms and detritus. Their mouth acts like a small vacuum cleaner, which helps them suck up their food into their system.

Species 
Below is a list of species of the Aeolosoma genus:
 Aeolosoma beddardi
 Aeolosoma headleyi
 Aeolosoma hemprichi
 Aeolosoma leidyi
 Aeolosoma niveum
 Aeolosoma tenebrarum
 Aeolosoma variegatum

Gallery

References

Polychaete genera
Annelids